Caleb Cassius Watts (born 16 January 2002) is an Australian professional soccer player who plays as a midfielder for EFL League One club Morecambe on loan from  club Southampton.

Club career

Southampton
Watts signed his first professional contract in July 2019. On 19 January 2021, Watts made his first professional appearance in Southampton's victory over Shrewsbury Town in the FA Cup. A week later, Watts made his Premier League debut, replacing Danny Ings in Southampton's 3–1 defeat to Arsenal. Watts became the 52nd Australian to play in the league.

On 12 January 2022, Watts joined Crawley Town for the remainder of the 2021–22 season. He made his debut for the club as a 63rd-minute substitute against Carlisle United on 15 January 2022, but came back off 18 minutes later after suffering a hamstring injury. 

On 23 June 2022, Watts joined Morecambe on loan for the 2022–23 season.

International career
Watts was born in England to an Australian father, and is eligible to represent both England and Australia internationally. He was named in the Australia U17 squad for the 2019 FIFA U-17 World Cup.

Watts qualified for the Tokyo 2020 Olympics. He was part of the Olyroos Olympic squad. The team beat Argentina in their first group match but were unable to win another match and were therefore not in medal contention.

Career statistics

References

External links

Southampton FC profile

2002 births
Living people
Australian soccer players
Australia youth international soccer players
Association football midfielders
Queens Park Rangers F.C. players
Southampton F.C. players
Crawley Town F.C. players
Morecambe F.C. players
Premier League players
Footballers at the 2020 Summer Olympics
Olympic soccer players of Australia
Australian expatriate sportspeople in England